Giulia Gonzaga (1513 – 16 April 1566) was an Italian ruler and letter writer of the Renaissance. She was the countess regnant of Rodigo  as the heir of her late spouse between 1528 and 1541.

Biography

Giulia was born in Gazzuolo (near Mantua) in 1512 the daughter of Ludovico Gonzaga, lord of Sabbioneta and Bozzolo, and Countess Francesca Fieschi.

In 1526 (at age 14) she was married to count Vespasiano Colonna (1480–1528), count of Fondi and duke of Traetto (present-day Minturno). 
After her husband died in 1528 three years after their marriage, he left her his domain, the County of Rodigo and stated the she was to be ruling count of this county until her death or until she remarried. Giulia organized her palace as a center of culture, attracting the attention of many of her contemporaries as much for these activities as for her famous beauty, though she refused to marry again. 
She had a liaison with Cardinal Ippolito de' Medici of Florence, who died in Itri (southern Lazio) after a meeting with her.

In the night of 8–9 August 1534, the town of Fondi was attacked by the corsair Barbarossa, who was seeking to kidnap her and deliver her to Suleiman the Magnificent, his emperor. Barbarossa had been ordered to kidnap her by Ibrahim Pasha, the Ottoman Grand Vizier. Pasha's plan was to add her to the sultan's harem and supplant Roxelana, the sultan's wife. 
She escaped, and Barbarossa, frustrated, massacred the populations of Fondi and nearby Sperlonga, though he was repulsed at nearby Itri. She fled into the night, accompanied by a single knight. 
James Reston alleges that Gonzaga later had the knight killed because she had been nearly nude during her escape, and he had seen too much, though he provides no reference for this claim. 
There is also speculation that Barbarossa's attempt may have been motivated by members of the Colonna family wishing to recover their lands after Vespasiano Colonna's death.

Giulia Gonzaga joined a convent in Naples in 1535 (at age 22); she did not become a nun, but lived in the convent as a laywoman and kept her domain as countess of Rodigo. In the convent she met Juan de Valdés in 1536. This encounter and subsequent correspondence brought her to the attention of the Inquisition, for example leading her to write a letter in 1553 to cardinal Ercole Gonzaga to express her lack of agreement with the later writings of de Valdés.

In 1541, she left her fief to her nephew Vespasiano I Gonzaga.

Giulia Gonzaga died at age 53 in 1566. After her death, her correspondence with Pietro Carnesecchi led to the latter's being burned at the stake for heresy (in 1567).

See also
Turkish Slave

References

External links
The above content summarized and translated from Eresie.it

Sources
 Camilla Russell, Giulia Gonzaga and the Religious Controversies of Sixteenth-century Italy Brepols, 2006, 

<

1513 births
1566 deaths
Giulia Gonzaga
People from Gazzuolo
16th-century Italian nobility
Slavery in the Ottoman Empire
16th-century women rulers
16th-century Italian women
Ottoman slave trade
Barbary slave trade